Nagmeldin "Peter" Bol (born 22 February 1994) is an Australian middle-distance runner who specialises in the 800 metres. He placed fourth at the 2020 Tokyo Olympics and won the silver medal at the 2022 Commonwealth Games.

Bol represented Australia in the men's 800 metres at the 2016 Rio Olympics. He is the Oceanian record holder for the event. In January 2023, it was announced that he had been provisionally suspended by Athletics Australia after failed out-of-competition doping test, with the test showing signs of synthetic EPO. On 14 February, it was reported that his suspension had been lifted as his B sample returned an atypical finding (ATF) for EPO, but Sport Integrity Australia would continue investigation.

Early life and education
Bol was born on 22 February 1994 in Khartoum, Sudan.  His mother is Sudanese, and his father from the region that is now South Sudan. His family fled the civil war in Sudan when he was four. In 2016, it was falsely reported that they lived in an Egyptian refugee camp for four years before emigrating to Australia. In August 2021, Bol wrote in The West Australian that "despite what some people have said and written, we never lived in a refugee camp." According to Media Watch, the false story originated with a 2016 article in The Sydney Morning Herald.

At the age of eight, Bol arrived in Toowoomba, Queensland. He grew up in Perth and attended St Norbert College on a basketball scholarship. In 2017, he completed a degree in construction management at Curtin University. , he was intending to train as an engineer.

Athletics career
Bol was a promising basketballer in Perth, Western Australia. When he was 16, a teacher at St Norbert College suggested he try 800 metres running after a promising cross-country race.

In 2013, Bol won the junior men's 800 m  at the Australian Athletics Championships in a personal best time of 1:48.90. In December 2015, he moved from Perth to Melbourne to train with coach Justin Rinaldi, who also coached joint national record holder Alexander Rowe.

In 2016, he ran two Olympic qualifying times (1:45.78 and 1:45.41) and was selected on the Australian team for the 2016 Rio Olympics. At the Games, Bol finished sixth in his heat with a time of 1:49.36.

At the 2017 World Championships in Athletics in London, he finished seventh in his heat in a time of 1:49.65.

In June 2018 at an IAAF meet in Stockholm, Sweden, he set a personal best of 1:44.56 in the 800 m defeating training partner Joseph Deng.

He was eliminated in the heats of his signature event at the 2019 World Championships held in Doha, Qatar, running 1:46.92.

At the postponed 2020 Tokyo Olympics, Bol came first in his semi-final with a personal best time of 1:44:11. He then came fourth in the tactical final missing out on a bronze medal by 0.53 of a second. The winning Emmanuel Korir's time of 1:45.06 was slower than the time that Bol had accomplished in his heat.

He set a new Oceania and Australian record of 1:44.00 in June 2022 at the Paris Diamond League. This was the third time he has lowered the national record in the 800 m. That year Bol finished seventh in his specialty at the World Championships held in Eugene, Oregon with a time of 1:45.51 before claiming the silver medal at the Birmingham Commonwealth Games in 1:47.66.

Achievements

International competitions

Circuit wins, and National titles
 Diamond League
 2018: Stockholm BAUHAUS-galan (800m)
 Australian Athletics Championships
 800 metres: 2019, 2021, 2022

Personal bests
 600 metres – 1:16.26 (Glendale 2019)
 800 metres – 	1:44.00 (Paris 2022) Oceanian record
 800 metres indoor – 1:47.70 (Ostrava 2019)
 1500 metres – 3:35.86 (Décines 2022)

References

Further reading

External links

Peter Bol at Australian Athletics Historical Results

Peter Bol Biography at ICMI

1994 births
Living people
Australian male middle-distance runners
Olympic athletes of Australia
Athletes (track and field) at the 2016 Summer Olympics
World Athletics Championships athletes for Australia
Australian people of South Sudanese descent
Sportspeople of South Sudanese descent
South Sudanese refugees
Sudanese refugees
Athletes from Perth, Western Australia
Australian Athletics Championships winners
Athletes (track and field) at the 2020 Summer Olympics
Commonwealth Games silver medallists for Australia
Commonwealth Games medallists in athletics
Athletes (track and field) at the 2022 Commonwealth Games
Medallists at the 2022 Commonwealth Games